Rock 'n Soul Part 1 (also titled Greatest Hits – Rock 'n Soul Part 1) is a greatest hits album by American musical duo Hall & Oates, credited as "Daryl Hall  John Oates" on the album cover. Released by RCA Records on October 18, 1983, the album featured mostly hit singles recorded by the duo and released by RCA, along with one single from the duo's period with Atlantic Records and two previously unreleased songs recorded earlier in the year: "Say It Isn't So" and "Adult Education".

The album was originally released on LP and cassette, with sides labeled "Side One" and "Side A", and was the duo's first album to be released on the then-new compact disc format. In 2006, the album was re-released on CD by RCA and Legacy Recordings with two bonus tracks. On October 16, 2015, Mobile Fidelity Sound Lab released the album on SACD but it doesn't include the bonus tracks of the 2006 CD.

The duo paired with HBO for a concert special; it became their first for pay TV; they performed a show at the Montreal Forum in Quebec, Canada on March 10 and 11, 1983; the performance was filmed and released as a VHS called: Rock 'n Soul Live; the video was certified Gold by the RIAA on July 15, 1986, denoting shipments of 50,000. The concert premiered on HBO on March 20, 1983; it features selections from the duo's album H2O; it was directed by Mike Mansfield and produced by Danny O'Donovan.

This compilation mostly features single versions of the songs.

Artwork and packaging 
The cover of Rock 'n Soul Part 1 was illustrated by Nancy Dwyer with photography by Larry Williams and art direction, on the original release, by Jeb Brien, Dwyer and Ron Kellum; in the cover photo, the band members are dressed in the same costumes from the music video for "One on One." The original LP release also featured a limited edition twelve-month calendar for 1984 designed by Joe Telmach. The 2006 CD release by RCA and Legacy with the reissue's art direction and design by Howard Fritzson and Bob Jones, respectively. The CD case featured four alternate album covers on the inlay with fold-out liner notes with a reproduction of the twelve-month calendar as well as "The Rock 'n Soul Part 1 Sessions" by bassist Tom "T-Bone" Wolk.

Track listing 
 "Say It Isn't So" (Daryl Hall) – 4:17
 "Sara Smile" (Hall, John Oates) – 3:09
 "She's Gone" [Single Version] (Hall, Oates) – 3:26
 "Rich Girl" (Hall) – 2:24
 "Kiss on My List" [45 Version] (Hall, Janna Allen) – 3:52
 "You Make My Dreams" (Hall, Oates, Sara Allen) – 3:07
 "Private Eyes" [Edited Version] (Hall, S. Allen, J. Allen, Warren Pash) – 3:27
 "Adult Education" (Hall, Oates, S. Allen) – 5:23
 "I Can't Go for That (No Can Do)" [Single Version] (Hall, Oates, S. Allen, J. Allen) – 3:45
 "Maneater" (Hall, Oates, S. Allen) – 4:31
 "One on One" [Single Version] (Hall) – 3:57
 "Wait for Me" [Recorded live at the Montreal Forum in March, 1983] (Hall) – 6:03
2006 remastered CD bonus tracks
 "Family Man" (Maggie Reilly, Morris Pert, Mike Oldfield, Tim Cross, Rick Fenn, Mike Frye) – 3:25
 "You've Lost That Lovin' Feeling" [Single Version] (Phil Spector, Barry Mann, Cynthia Weil) – 4:09

Personnel 
 Daryl Hall – vocals, keyboards, synthesizers, guitars, vibraphone, arrangements (8)
 John Oates – vocals, keyboards, synthesizers, guitars, arrangements (8)
 Charlie DeChant – keyboards, saxophones, additional backing vocals 
 Tom "T-Bone" Wolk – keyboards, guitars, bass guitar, additional backing vocals, arrangements (8)
 G. E. Smith – lead guitars
 Mickey Curry – drums

Additional musicians (Tracks 1 & 8)
 Robbie Kilgore – keyboards
 Wells Christy – synthesizers
 Clive Smith – synthesizers
 Jimmy Bralower – drum programming (1)

Production 
 Daryl Hall – producer (1, 2 & 5–12)
 John Oates – producer  (1, 2 & 5–12)
 Bob Clearmountain – co-producer (1 & 8), engineer (1 & 8), remixing (12)
 Christopher Bond – producer (2 & 4)
 Arif Mardin – producer (3)
 Neil Kernon – co-producer (5, 6, 7, 9, 10 & 11)
 Bruce Buchalter – assistant engineer (1 & 8)
 Bob Ludwig – mastering at Masterdisk (New York, NY)
 Nile Rodgers – arrangements (8)
 J. J. Stelmach – calendar design 
 Jeb Brien – art direction
 Nancy Dwyer – art direction, illustration 
 Ron Kellum – art direction
 Larry Williams – inner sleeve photography 
 Tommy Mottola – management

Charts

Weekly charts

Year-end charts

Certifications and sales

References 

Albums produced by Neil Kernon
Hall & Oates compilation albums
1983 greatest hits albums
RCA Records compilation albums